Forrest Reid (born 24 June 1875, Belfast, Ireland; d. 4 January 1947, Warrenpoint, County Down, Northern Ireland) was an Irish novelist, literary critic and translator. He was, along with Hugh Walpole and J. M. Barrie, a leading pre-war novelist of boyhood. He is still acclaimed as the greatest of Ulster novelists and was recognised with the award of the 1944 James Tait Black Memorial Prize for his novel Young Tom.

Early life and education
Born in Belfast, he was the youngest son of a Protestant family of twelve, six of whom survived. He was educated at the Royal Belfast Academical Institution. His father, Robert Reid (1825–1881), was the manager of a felt works, having failed as a shipowner at Liverpool, and came from a well-established upper-middle-class Ulster family; his mother, Frances Matilda, was his father's second wife. She was the daughter of Captain Robert Parr, of the 54th Regiment of Foot, of the landed gentry Parr family of Shropshire, related to Catherine Parr, last wife of King Henry VIII.  After graduation Forster continued to visit Reid, who was then settled back in Belfast. In 1952, Forster traveled to Belfast to unveil a plaque commemorating Forrest Reid's life (at 13 Ormiston Crescent).

Works and influences
As well as his fiction, Reid also translated poems from the Greek Anthology (Greek Authors (Faber, 1943)). His study of the work of W. B. Yeats (W. B. Yeats: A Critical Study (1915)) has been acclaimed as one of the best critical studies of that poet. He also wrote the definitive work on the English woodcut artists of the 1860s (Illustrators of the Sixties (1928)); his collection of original illustrations from that time is housed in the Ashmolean Museum, Oxford.

He was a close friend of Walter de la Mare, whom he first met in 1913, and about whose fiction he published a perceptive book in 1929. Reid was also an influence on novelist Stephen Gilbert, and had good connections to the Bloomsbury Group of writers. Reid was a founding member of the Imperial Art League (later the Artists League of Great Britain). Reid was also a close friend of Arthur Greeves, the artist known to be C. S. Lewis's best friend. Greeves painted several portraits of Reid, now all in the possession of the Royal Belfast Academical Institution.

Critical standing
A "Forrest Reid Collection" is held at the University of Exeter, consisting of first editions of all his works and books about Reid. Many of his original manuscripts are in the archives of the Belfast Central Library. In 2008, Queen's University Belfast catalogued a large collection of Forrest Reid documentary material it had recently acquired, including many letters from E.M. Forster.

Works

Fiction

 The Kingdom of Twilight (1904)
 The Garden God – A Tale of Two Boys (1905)
 The Bracknels – A Family Chronicle (1911), revised as Denis Bracknel (1947)
 Following Darkness (1912)
 The Gentle Lover – A Comedy of Middle Age (1913)
 At the Door of the Gate (1915)
 The Spring Song (1916)
 A Garden by the Sea (1918)(stories)
 Pirates of the Spring (1919)
 Pender among the Residents (1922)
 Demophon – a Traveller's Tale (1927)
 Uncle Stephen (1931)
 Brian Westby (1934)
 The Retreat (1936)
 Peter Waring (1937)
 Young Tom (1944)

Autobiography 

 Apostate (1926)
 Private Road (1940)

Reissue editions
Beginning in 2007, Valancourt Books began releasing editions of Reid's works, all containing new introductions by authors and scholars:

 The Garden God: A Tale of Two Boys (2007), edited with a foreword, introduction and notes by Michael Matthew Kaylor
 The Tom Barber Trilogy (2011) hardcover two-volume set
 The Spring Song (2013)
 Following Darkness (2013)
 Brian Westby (2013)
 Denis Bracknel (2014)
 Pender among the Residents (2014)
 Uncle Stephen (2014)
 The Retreat (2015)
 Young Tom (2015)

See also
List of Northern Irish writers

References 

 Paul Goldman and Brian Taylor, Retrospective Adventures: Forrest Reid, Author and Collector (Scholar Press, 1998)
 Colin Cruise, "Error & Eros: The Fiction of Forrest Reid", Sex, Nation & Dissent (Cork University Press, 1997)
 Brian Taylor, The Green Avenue: The Life and Writings of Forrest Reid, (Cambridge University Press, 1980)
 Russell Burlingham, Forrest Reid: A Portrait & A Study (Faber, 1953) 
 John Wilson Foster, critical readings of Forrest Reid in Forces and Themes in Ulster Fiction (Totowa: Rowman and Littlefield; Dublin: Gill & Macmillan, 1974), pp. 139–48, 197–211
 Eamonn Hughes, "Ulster of the Senses", Fortnight #306 (May 1992) – essay about Reid's autobiography

External links

 
 
 Forrest Reid website, including biography, photographs and links 
 Catalogue from the Forrest Reid/Stephen Gilbert exhibition (Queen's University Belfast, 2008) 
 Forrest Reid at Valancourt Books
 

1875 births
1947 deaths
Alumni of Christ's College, Cambridge
Irish literary critics
James Tait Black Memorial Prize recipients
Gay writers from Northern Ireland
Male writers from Northern Ireland
Writers from Belfast